Quiet Bliss is a 2014 Italian drama film directed by Edoardo Winspeare. The film premiered at the 2014 Berlin International Film Festival.

References

External links 

Italian drama films
2014 drama films
2010s Italian films